Tegua is an island in Vanuatu's Torres Islands chain, located in Torba Province.

Geography
The island spans 7 km by 6.5 km; on the eastern side of the island is Lateu Bay indented 1.8 km. Ngwel Island is located 600 meters off the west coast of Tegua Island.

Population
The only village is Lateu, with a population of 58.  About 100 residents of Tegua were evacuated by the government because rising sea levels were flooding their island.

One geological study found that of four islands in the group, Tegua had the slowest inferred uplift rate at 0.7 mm/yr for southeastern Tegua. A "narrow E-W trending block has been down-dropped relative to the rest of the isle.

Name
The name Tegua  comes from the Mota language, which was used as the primary language of the Melanesian Mission. Locally, the island is called Tugue  in Lo-Toga, and Töyö  in Hiw. These names all come from a Proto-Torres-Banks form *Teɣua.

References

External links
 “The Mystery of the Sinking South Pacific Islands” by Gerald Traufetter, Der Spiegel international, 15/6/2012.

Islands of Vanuatu
Torba Province